The House of Youth is a 1924 American silent drama film directed by Ralph Ince and starring Jacqueline Logan, Malcolm McGregor and Gloria Grey.

Cast
 Jacqueline Logan as Corinna Endicott
 Malcolm McGregor as Spike Blaine
 Vernon Steele as Rhodes Winston
 Gloria Grey as 	Amy Marsden
 Richard Travers as Mitch Hardy
 Rosa Castro as Linda Richards 
 Edwin B. Tilton as Cornelius Endicott
 Aileen Manning as Aunt Maggie Endicott
 Hugh Metcalfe as Butler
 Barbara Tennant as Mrs. Mitch Hardy
 Nola Luxford as 	Society Girl

References

Bibliography
 Connelly, Robert B. The Silents: Silent Feature Films, 1910-36, Volume 40, Issue 2. December Press, 1998.
 Munden, Kenneth White. The American Film Institute Catalog of Motion Pictures Produced in the United States, Part 1. University of California Press, 1997.

External links
 

1924 films
1924 drama films
1920s English-language films
American silent feature films
Silent American drama films
Films directed by Ralph Ince
American black-and-white films
Producers Distributing Corporation films
1920s American films